Wedding Day may refer to:

Wedding

Film and TV
Rebecca's Wedding Day, a 1914 American short comedy film starring Fatty Arbuckle
Dr. Kildare's Wedding Day, a 1941 drama film directed by Harold S. Bucquet
 Wedding Day (film), a 1942 Italian comedy film
Wedding Day (TV series), an Australian television series 1956-1957

Music
"Wedding Day at Troldhaugen" (Norwegian: Bryllupsdag på Troldhaugen), a piano piece composed by Edvard Grieg

Albums
Wedding Day, an album by Area

Songs
"Wedding Day", a 2014 song by Courtney Love
"Wedding Day", a 1949 song by Freddy Martin
"Wedding Day", a 1956 song by Ken Curtis
"Wedding Day", a 1958 song by The Dells 
"Wedding Day", a 1958 song by Ersel Hickey
"Wedding Day", a 1960 song by Ray Peterson 
"Wedding Day", a 1961 song by Johnny Adams
"Wedding Day", a 1964 song by Arne Bendiksen
"Wedding Day", a 1990 song by Steve Booker
"Wedding Day", a song by Roy Orbison from Crying (1962), covered by Don Bailey
"Wedding Day", a song by Paul Young from Between Two Fires (1986)
"Wedding Day", a song by UB40 from Labour of Love II (1989)
"Wedding Day", a song by Rosie Thomas from When We Were Small (2001)
"Wedding Day", a song by Alpha Rev from The Greatest Thing I've Ever Learned (2007)
"Wedding Day", a duet by Heidi Klum and Seal from Seal's album System (2007)
"Wedding Day", a song by Casting Crowns from Come to the Well (2011)
"Wedding Day", a song by Tori Amos from Unrepentant Geraldines (2014)
"Wedding Day", a song from Love Songs and This Is Where I Came In
"Svatben den"  "Our Wedding Day", a song by The Crickets
"Wedding Day", a song by Bon Jovi
"Our Wedding Day", a folk song She Moved Through the Fair